Nights of Ballads & Blues is the third album by the jazz pianist McCoy Tyner, released on the Impulse! label in 1963. It features performances by Tyner with Steve Davis on bass and Lex Humphries on drums.

Reception
The jazz critic Harvey Pekar said in his August 29, 1963, review for Down Beat magazine, "Tyner's playing has many virtues, but one in particular is his tastefulness. There is nothing trivial about his music; he is, to quote an often used phrase, a 'musician's musician.'" The Allmusic review by Stephen Cook states that the album "qualifies as one of the pianist's most enjoyable early discs".

Reviewing the album in 2017, Marc Myers of JazzWax said: "For some strange reason, in late 1962 and the first half of 1963, Tyner was asked by producer Bob Thiele to record more straightforward jazz albums as a leader... Tyner's playing is exciting and exceptional on all of the tracks...  On the album, he exhibits a reserved elegance and tenderness that reveals the other side of his personality—a lover of melody and standards. In this regard, there are traces of Oscar Peterson in his playing. Perhaps Thiele was using Tyner to take a bite out of Peterson's vast and successful early-'60s share of the jazz market."

Track listing 

 "Satin Doll" (Ellington, Mercer, Strayhorn) - 5:40
 "We'll Be Together Again" (Fischer, Laine) - 3:40
 "'Round Midnight" (Monk) - 6:23
 "For Heaven's Sake" (Elise Bretton, Edwards, Donald Meyer) - 3:48
 "Star Eyes" (De Paul, Raye) - 5:03
 "Blue Monk" (Monk) - 5:22
 "Groove Waltz" (Tyner) - 5:31
 "Days of Wine and Roses" (Mancini, Mercer) - 3:21

Personnel 
 McCoy Tyner - piano
 Steve Davis - double bass
 Lex Humphries - drums

References 

1963 albums
McCoy Tyner albums
Albums produced by Bob Thiele
Impulse! Records albums
Albums recorded at Van Gelder Studio